Råsunda Stadium (also known as Råsunda Fotbollsstadion, Råsundastadion, Råsunda Football Stadium or just Råsunda) was the Swedish national football stadium. It was located in Solna Municipality in Stockholm and named after the district in Solna where it is located. The stadium was demolished in 2013 after being replaced by the Friends Arena.

History
It was opened in 1937 although there had already existed stadiums at the site; the earliest opened in 1910. The inaugural match took place on 18 April 1937 when AIK played against Malmö FF, AIK won the match 4–0, with Axel Nilsson scoring the historical first goal. Råsunda has a capacity of 35,000–36,608 depending on usage. The 1910 stadium hosted some of the football and some of the shooting events at the 1912 Summer Olympics. The stadium was the home stadium for AIK, and was used for many derbies between Stockholm clubs. It also hosted the headquarters of the Swedish Football Association, and staged 75% of the home matches of the national football team each year, with most other matches being played at Ullevi in Gothenburg. These two stadiums are UEFA 4-star rated football stadiums.

The record attendance was 52,943 and was set on 26 September 1965, when Sweden played West Germany. West Germany won the match 2–1.

The last major concert held at the stadium was on 7 June 1986, when British rock band Queen kicked off their final tour, The Magic Tour, at Råsunda. That night Queen played to about 37,500 fans.

Råsunda was the first of two stadiums to have hosted the World Cup finals for both men and women. It hosted the men's final in the 1958 World Cup and the women's final in the 1995 Women's World Cup. The other stadium with this honor is the Rose Bowl in Pasadena, California, USA (men in 1994 World Cup, women in 1999 Women's World Cup).

1958 FIFA World Cup
Råsunda Stadium hosted eight games of the 1958 FIFA World Cup, including the final match.

References

http://www.fastighetssverige.se/artikel/sa-har-blir-nya-rasunda-10654/

External links 

 AIK presentation
 Råsunda Stadium

AIK Fotboll
1995 FIFA Women's World Cup stadiums
1958 FIFA World Cup stadiums
Football venues in Sweden
Sports venues in Stockholm
Solna Municipality
UEFA Euro 1992 stadiums
Sweden
Football venues in Stockholm
Sports venues completed in 1937
1937 establishments in Sweden
Demolished buildings and structures in Sweden
Sports venues demolished in 2013
2013 disestablishments in Sweden
Defunct football venues in Sweden